The Garden of One Thousand Buddhas is a spiritual site near Arlee, Montana, within the Flathead Indian Reservation in Lake County, Montana. It is intended to be a pilgrimage destination for the Western hemisphere and is expected by its builders to become a major place of worship for people of many faiths. It is free to the public and will feature over one thousand statues.

History

The garden was founded by Gochen Tulku Sang-ngag Rinpoche, a Tibetan master of the Nyingma school of Buddhism. Following a traditional Buddhist method, Sang-Ngag claimed to have chosen the location immediately upon seeing it, recalling a prophetic dream from his youth which corresponded to the garden's landscape. Subsequently, Sang-ngag's non-profit organization, Ewam, received the land in an anonymous donation by one of the Rinpoche's disciples, and construction began in 2000.

, volunteers maintain the grounds, raise publicity, and are casting the 1,000 statues from concrete; the 1,000 stupas required for the site's design are finished. The largest statue, a representation of the goddess Tara, stands completed at the garden's center. A 2010 report estimated 450 of 1000 Buddhas had been completed and are being stored in a barn until all the statues are ready for placement. Since then, many more have likely been sculpted in anticipation of a visit and consecration from the 14th Dalai Lama when the garden is completed.

Design and symbolism

Dharmacakra

Set in the Jocko Valley, the monument itself is a footpath in the shape of a dharmacakra (trns. "Wheel of Dharma"), a central symbol of Buddhism with manifold meanings. It represents the teachings of the Buddha, specifically the Noble Eightfold Path and the cycle of life, death, and rebirth. As a form of mandala, it can also be said to represent existence in its entirety. Five hundred feet in diameter, the path is composed of an outer ring and eight symmetrical lines stemming from the central statue of Tara.

Yum Chenmo, Prajnaparamita
The deity Prajnaparamita represents the pinnacle of an enlightened woman: a yogini who has, through mastery of wisdom, become a dakini, or female supernatural being. She advocates wisdom through realization of the "empty," or ephemeral nature of the sensual world. She is also known as Yum Chenmo, Mahamaya, Prajnaparamita (the symbolic mother of all Buddhas), and is associated with the Hindu concept of Shakti. Her statue features an ornamental base with traditional Buddhist motifs and is twenty-four feet tall.

1,000 Buddhas

Each straight path will be lined with 125 two-foot statues of male Buddhas, representing the 1,000 avatars written of in Buddhist texts who are destined to redeem the world in successive eras, of which Gautama Buddha was only the fourth.

Landscaping
The garden area will feature many flowering plants, particularly lavender, and 1,000 planted trees. A pond and four prayer wheels are additional features.

Purpose and usage
It is Sang-ngag's intention that the garden will inspire Buddhist ideals of joy, wisdom, and compassion in a place where Eastern philosophy is not widely known, thus bringing all beings closer to enlightenment: the sworn goal of Boddhisatvas.

The garden's center is for ceremonial gatherings, and has been used as a venue for mass or individual prayer, speeches, musical performances, and shared spiritual practices with the local Salish-Kootenai people. A 2011 interview quoted tribal officials as grateful for the open and nondenominational nature of the garden, a welcome difference from other immigrant cultures which have been allowed to purchase tribal land because of a 1910 act that permits non-tribal settlement. Certain similar beliefs, and a shared history of persecution in their native lands have been described as uniting factors between the Buddhists and people of the Confederated Salish Kootenai Tribes. Sang-ngag himself was imprisoned during the Chinese Invasion of Tibet for ten years. 

The statue of Tara can be used for the Hindu practice of darshan, similar to Buddhist deity-visualization meditations, wherein a worshiper focuses intensely on the symbolism of a temple's principal deity. Some Buddhists and Hindus believe that a yogi who is devoted enough may experience a blessing or even miraculous contact with the divine through a statue or other representation. Such art is considered murti, the divine embodied in an inanimate object. The object itself is not worshipped; Hindu-Buddhist philosophy generally considers physical matter insubstantial and illusory. Instead, the murti serves as a conduit of an omnipresent divinity (i.e. Brahman, Nirvana) which becomes a personal god as the result of the devotee's spiritual efforts.

The outer rim is to be used for the practice of circumambulation, walking clockwise around a sacred location while meditating on the cyclical nature of existence.

See also
 Bhadrakalpikasutra c. 200-250 CE, which gives names of 1002 Buddhas

References

External links
The Garden of One Thousand Buddhas
Ewam International

Tourist attractions in Lake County, Montana
Buddhism in Montana
Gardens in Montana
Buddha statues
Sculpture gardens, trails and parks in the United States